The Society for Historians of the Early American Republic (SHEAR) is an organization that was established in 1977 to study the history of the United States in the period between 1775 and 1861.

The Society holds annual conferences, awards prizes and fellowships, and publishes the Journal of the Early Republic.

Members

 Richard D. Brown
 Joanne B. Freeman 
 Annette Gordon-Reed
 Daniel Walker Howe
 Alan Taylor (historian)

External links
 Official website

Organizations established in 1977
History organizations based in the United States